Daniel Cornelius van Holst Pellekaan is a former Australian politician, representing the South Australian House of Assembly seat of Stuart for the South Australian Division of the Liberal Party of Australia from 2010 state election until he lost the seat in the 2022 state election.

Van Holst Pellekaan was the Deputy Premier of South Australia between November 2021 and March 2022, and served as the Minister for Energy and Mining in the Marshall Ministry between 2018 and 2022.

Early life and education
Van Holst Pellekaan was born in Canberra, to a Dutch father who had emigrated to Australia at the age of two. The family moved to Washington D.C. when his father was offered a position at the World Bank, and Dan attended the Maret School. He was active in sport, playing American football and basketball for Maret, and later moved to Canada to study and play basketball at the University of Toronto.

He moved back to Australia when he was recruited by the Hobart Devils basketball team in Tasmania, where he played for four years while studying for a Bachelor of Economics degree.

After graduating, van Holst Pellekaan moved to Melbourne to work for BP. He later moved to the outback where he and some friends bought Spud's Roadhouse in Pimba, South Australia. After seven years, he worked in other tourism ventures, then moved to Wilmington after meeting his wife, Rebecca.

Political career
In Wilmington, following the announcement of the retirement of Graham Gunn, van Holst Pellekaan gained Liberal Party endorsement for the seat of Stuart; and was elected at the 2010 state election.

Following the 2018 state election, van Holst Pellekaan was appointed as the Minister for Energy and Mining. On 25 November 2021, following the resignation of Vickie Chapman as deputy party leader and Deputy Premier, van Holst Pellekaan was elected as the new deputy leader, defeating David Speirs in a party room ballot. He was sworn in as Deputy Premier of South Australia that day.

He lost his seat at the 2022 state election to independent Geoff Brock, who had transferred from the Frome following a redistribution.

Interests
Van Holst Pellekaan was listed as a “bronze sponsor” of the 2018 Kapunda Rodeo in the event programme.

References

 

Members of the South Australian House of Assembly
Liberal Party of Australia members of the Parliament of South Australia
Living people
Australian people of Dutch descent
21st-century Australian politicians
Australian men's basketball players
University of Tasmania alumni
Hobart Devils players
Year of birth missing (living people)